Events from the year 1881 in Scotland.

Incumbents

Law officers 
 Lord Advocate – John McLaren until August; then John Blair Balfour
 Solicitor General for Scotland – John Blair Balfour; then Alexander Asher

Judiciary 
 Lord President of the Court of Session and Lord Justice General – Lord Glencorse
 Lord Justice Clerk – Lord Moncreiff

Events 
 1 March – the Cunard Line's , the first steel transatlantic liner, is launched at J. & G. Thomson's shipyard at Clydebank.
 12 March – Andrew Watson of Glasgow's Queen's Park F.C. (from a mixed Scottish/British Guianese background) captains the Scotland national football team in a 6–1 victory against England, becoming the world's first black international Association football player.
 1 July – formation, under the Childers Reforms of the British Army, of the Argyll and Sutherland Highlanders, Cameronians (Scottish Rifles), Gordon Highlanders, Highland Light Infantry and Seaforth Highlanders. 
 20/21 July – 58 men, the crews of ten fishing boats (mostly sixareens) from Yell, Shetland, are drowned in a sudden storm.
 25 August – Edinburgh Royal Review of Volunteers ("The Wet Review"): Large numbers of Volunteer Forces from all over Scotland parade before Queen Victoria in Holyrood Park on a day of prolonged heavy rainfall.
 14 October – the Eyemouth disaster ("Black Friday"): a severe storm strikes the Berwickshire coast; 189 fishermen die.
 21 December – the Aberdeen Line's SS Aberdeen, the first oceangoing ship successfully powered by a triple expansion steam engine, designed by Alexander Carnegie Kirk, is launched at Robert Napier and Sons' yard at Govan.
 The remains of Alexander Lindsay, 25th Earl of Crawford (died 1880), are stolen from the family crypt on the Dunecht estate.
 Memorial cairn erected at the site of the Battle of Culloden (1746).
 Bruichladdich distillery established on the Rinns of Islay.
 Clydebank Co-operative Society formed.
 Inverness Museum and Art Gallery originally opened.
 Fettesian-Lorettonian Club established as a joint sporting club of the two named Edinburgh public schools, primarily for the playing of rugby union.

Births 
 29 March – Charles Jarvis, soldier, Victoria Cross recipient (died 1948)
 6 August – Alexander Fleming, biologist, pharmacologist and botanist (died 1955 in England)
 2 November – Tom Johnston, socialist politician (died 1965)
 6 November – Alfred David McAlpine, civil engineering contractor (died 1944)
 1 December – Alastair Denniston, cryptanalyst (died 1961 in England)
 25 December – Willie Gallacher, trade unionist and communist MP (died 1965)

Deaths 
 22 August – John Hill Burton, advocate, historian and economist (born 1809)
 30 October – William Brodie, sculptor (born 1815)
 31 October – Alexander Macdonald, miner, trade unionist and Lib–Lab MP (born 1821)

See also 
 Timeline of Scottish history
 1881 in the United Kingdom

References 

 
Years of the 19th century in Scotland
Scotland
1880s in Scotland